The Eurovision Song Contest 1969 was the 14th edition of the annual Eurovision Song Contest. Organised by the European Broadcasting Union (EBU) and host broadcaster Televisión Española (TVE), the contest was held at the Teatro Real on 29 March 1969 and was hosted by Spanish television presenter and actress Laurita Valenzuela.

Sixteen countries took part in the contest with Austria deciding not to participate this year.

It was the first time in the history of the contest that a tie had occurred, and as there was no tiebreaker rule in place at the time, all four countries were declared joint winners. France's win was their fourth, thus making it the first country to win the contest four times. The Netherlands' win was their third. Spain and the United Kingdom each won for the second time, with Spain becoming the first country to win the Eurovision Song Contest twice in a row.

Location 

The venue selected to host the 1969 contest was the Teatro Real, an opera house located in Madrid. The theatre reopened in 1966 as a concert theatre and the main concert venue of the Spanish National Orchestra and the RTVE Symphony Orchestra. The stage featured a metal sculpture created by surrealist Spanish artist .

Format 
The surrealist Spanish artist Salvador Dalí was responsible for designing the publicity material for the 1969 contest.

It was the first time that the contest resulted in a tie for first place, with four countries each gaining 18 votes. Since there was at the time no rule to cover such an eventuality, all four countries were declared joint winners. This caused an unfortunate problem concerning the medals due to be distributed to the winners as there were not enough to go round, so that only the singers received their medals on the night: the songwriters, to some disgruntlement, were not awarded theirs until some days later. It was the second contest to be filmed and transmitted in colour, even though TVE did not have colour equipment at the time. It had to rent colour TV cameras from the ARD German network. In Spain itself the broadcast was seen in black and white because the local transmitters did not support colour transmissions. The equipment for archiving the broadcast did not arrive in time, so TVE only had a black and white copy of the contest, until a colour copy was discovered in the archives of the NRK.

Participating countries 

Austria was absent from the contest, officially because they could not find a suitable representative, but it was rumoured that they refused to participate in a contest staged in Franco-ruled Spain. Wales wanted to debut with Welsh language broadcaster BBC Cymru, and also made a national selection called Cân i Gymru, but in the end it was decided they would not participate in the competition – their participation was rejected because Wales is not a sovereign state. Only the BBC has the exclusive right to represent the United Kingdom.

Conductors 
Each performance had a conductor who led the orchestra. These are listed below.

 Miljenko Prohaska
 Augusto Algueró
 Augusto Algueró
 Hervé Roy
 Noel Kelehan
 Ezio Leoni
 Johnny Harris
 Frans de Kok
 Lars Samuelson
 Francis Bay
 Henry Mayer
 Øivind Bergh
 Hans Blum
 Franck Pourcel
 Ferrer Trindade
 Ossi Runne

Returning artists

Participants and results

Detailed voting results 

Although neither jury made any errors in their announcements, scrutineer Clifford Brown asked both the Spanish and the Monegasque juries to repeat their scores. No adjustments were made to the scoring as a result of the repetition.

Spokespersons 

Listed below is the order in which votes were cast during the 1969 contest along with the spokesperson who was responsible for announcing the votes for their respective country.

 Helga Vlahović
 TBC
 Ramón Rivera
 TBC
 John Skehan
 Mike Bongiorno
 Colin Ward-Lewis
 
 
 Eugène Senelle
 
 
 
 
 Maria Manuela Furtado

Broadcasts 

Each participating broadcaster was required to relay the contest via its networks. Non-participating EBU member broadcasters were also able to relay the contest as "passive participants". Broadcasters were able to send commentators to provide coverage of the contest in their own native language and to relay information about the artists and songs to their television viewers.

Known details on the broadcasts in each country, including the specific broadcasting stations and commentators are shown in the tables below. In addition to the participating countries, the contest was also reportedly broadcast in Tunisia, in Czechoslovakia, East Germany, Hungary, Poland, Romania and the Soviet Union via Intervision, and in Brazil, Chile, Mexico and Puerto Rico.

Notes

References

External links 

 
1969
Music festivals in Spain
1969 in Spain
1969 in music
1960s in Madrid
March 1969 events in Europe
Events in Madrid